Geordy Jean-Claude Edouard Gony (born 15 May 1994), is a New Caledonian professional footballer who plays as a midfielder for Hienghène Sport.

References

External links

1994 births
Living people
New Caledonian footballers
New Caledonia international footballers
Association football midfielders
Hienghène Sport players